Parliamentary elections were held in the Federated States of Micronesia on 2 March 2021, to elect ten of the fourteen seats of the Congress of Micronesia for a two-year term. There are no political parties and all candidates stood as independents.

Electoral system
The 14-member Congress has ten members elected every two years by first-past-the-post voting in single-member constituencies and four senators (representing each of the four states, Yap, Chuuk, Pohnpei, and Kosrae) who are elected every four years, the last time being in 2019 and the next time in 2023.

Results

References

Elections in the Federated States of Micronesia
Micronesia
Parliamentary election
Election and referendum articles with incomplete results
Non-partisan elections